Stockholm City Theatre is live performance theater located in Stockholm, Sweden.  The theatre  is situated near the Sergel fountain and the Stockholm City roundabout.

Location
It is  located in one of Stockholm's most popular public buildings, the cultural center known as Kulturhuset.   Besides the theatre, Kulturhuset also includes small cafés, book shops, a bar and a restaurant, a library, various exhibitions, public debates, lectures, book signings, a small medieval museum, and workshops.

Stockholms stadsteater was created in 1956 but the first performance was delayed until 1960. It had not yet been decided at that point where in the city the theatre would be situated so the Folkets hus building at Norra Bantorget, with a temporary stage, became the first solution. However, this "temporary solution" lasted for nearly thirty years until the autumn of 1990, when all activity finally moved to the present location at Sergels torg.

The theatre is one of Sweden's most popular stage and the theatre with the highest bookings, as well as the constant "competitor" in Stockholm to the Royal Dramatic Theatre. Stockholms stadsteater produces 30-40 productions each year on nine stages. In 2005 there were 450,000 visitors, a relatively high rate considering a national population of 9 million.

Popular Swedish actors of the Stockholms stadsteater ensemble include Helena Bergström, Göran Ragnerstam, Ingvar Hirdwall, Sven Wollter, Ann Petrén, Anna-Maria Hallgarn and Jakob Eklund.

Stages
 Stora scenen - main stage; 550 seats
 Lilla scenen - 323 seats
 Klarascenen - 336 seats
 Kafé Klara/Klara soppteater - café and lunch theatre
 Parkteatern - the outdoor/open-air stage; free admission
 Lagret - stage part of "Unga Klara"; founded in the 1970s; 200 seats
 Akvariet - stage part of "Unga Klara"; founded in the 1970s; 90 seats
 Skärholmen - stage in Skärholmen suburb, outside Stockholm city centre
 Bryggan - intimate stage for contemporary drama and monologues; 70 seats
 c/o - the stage for guest performances from abroad

References

External links
Stockholm stadsteater official website

Theatres in Stockholm
Buildings and structures in Stockholm
Culture in Stockholm
Tourist attractions in Stockholm